Nickelodeon is a Philippine pay television channel that was launched on April 1, 2011, as a localised variant of American channel Nickelodeon, with programming aimed at children and teenagers. It is owned by Paramount Networks EMEAA in partnership with All Youth Channels. Upon its launch, it replaced the Southeast Asian feed of Nickelodeon in the Philippines, which used to be distributed in the country since its launch in 1998.

On October 11, 2006, Viacom's then subsidiary MTV Networks Asia Pacific set up a new unit to manage Nickelodeon's southeast Asia operations. On April 1, 2011, MTV Networks launched a dedicated Filipino Nickelodeon channel.

History

Background
An hour-long Nickelodeon television program premiered on People's Television Network in the Philippines on April 10, 1989; it featured the segment Mr. Wizard's World, among others.

1998–2011: As part of Nickelodeon Southeast Asia
In October 1998, Nickelodeon decided to reach the popular channel to the Philippines, Japan and Russia as an attempt to bring the popular channel to Asia. One of their shorts were Right Here, Right Now (based on the 1993 Nick USA shorts) and their ID's were by FRONT. In 2003, it became a part of Nicksplat (Nickelodeon's headquarters in Asia).

On October 11, 2006, Viacom's subsidiary MTV Networks Asia Pacific set up a new unit to manage Nickelodeon (Southeast Asia) TV based in Singapore. Nickelodeon was launched in Singapore and expanded its services in Southeast Asia, South Asia, and Polynesia. Nickelodeon Philippines, Nickelodeon Pakistan, and Nickelodeon India started working independently. They started their new website in 2003.

On March 15, 2010, Nickelodeon revamped their logo same as the United States and worldwide and started broadcasting newer Nickelodeon shows from the United States that represents the new Nickelodeon logo and airs latest episodes of current Nick shows.

2011–present: Nickelodeon Philippines
On April 1, 2011, the Nickelodeon Asia feed was replaced with a dedicated Filipino Nickelodeon channel, although it will still use the Nick-Asia branding used in other countries. On April 11, 2011, the lineup was changed prior to Nickelodeon Southeast Asia. The new schedule will put live-action programs in the primetime slot and will double the Nick Jr. block.

Nickelodeon celebrated the release of the new channel on April 9, 2011, on the Bonifacio Global City, Open Field, Taguig City with the event entitled, "Nick World". The event included mascots of notable Nicktoon characters with storytelling, an animals show, martial arts performances and a world of exciting attractions, booths, and modules for kids.

Starting on May 23, 2011, the lineup of Nickelodeon will once again change where they will cease airing the Nick Jr. block in the afternoon timeslot and will be replaced by live-action shows and miscellaneous NickToons programs. This lineup will double the TeenNick block which only runs in the evening and other animated shows that only airs once a day.

In 2012, Nickelodeon uses new graphics used in the US and UK, but only applies to selected programs' promos and station IDs. The former Nick-Asia graphics is still used.

In 2013, Nickelodeon Philippines introduced Hapon Hangout, a Nickelodeon hour special that starts at 4:00pm to 6:30pm every weekdays.

On July 17, 2017, the channel was rebranded into the US version. It was made by Superestudio, an Argentinian branding agency.

Nickelodeon Philippines Kids Choice Awards

The Philippines Kids Choice Awards is the second setting of the Kids Choice Awards in Asia preceded by Indonesia. The show was first held since 2008 at the Aliw Theater in Pasay and was first hosted by Michael V. with some various Filipino artists. Nickelodeon, an American cable television network, brought Kids' Choice Awards to the Philippines in an effort to strengthen its presence in Asia. According to Amit Jain, executive Vice-President and managing director of MTV Networks India, China and Southeast Asia, "This is a milestone for Nickelodeon's business in Southeast Asia as it will deliver on Nick's commitment of providing global kids-centric shows and properties which are adapted to reflect local tastes and aspirations." The Philippines KCA has been inactive all over the years.

Nowadays, it was revived as a category representing the Philippines.

Nickelodeon on free-to-air television
Prior to the launch of Nickelodeon Philippines in the fall of 1998, Nickelodeon first aired in the country as a block of the free-to-air state-owned TV channel PTV until 1992. The block used to air in the mornings and afternoons consisting of mostly drama-related programmes, educational and game shows. Then, it moved to New Vision 9 until 1998, and again from 2003 to 2006 as RPN 9. During that time, GMA 7 purchased the rights to air Rugrats and selected Nick Jr. shows (including Dora the Explorer) from 1998 to 2006.

RPN and GMA lost the broadcasting rights of Nickelodeon shows to ABC in May 2006. Nick shows were later dubbed for the first time to Filipino on August 11, 2008 (with the exception of Go, Diego, Go!), making it the first national network to do so. Later rebranded as TV5, the channel ended its contract with Nickelodeon on June 30, 2010, months after it was purchased by PLDT's MediaQuest Holdings from the Cojuangco group and Malaysia-based broadcaster Media Prima Berhad which caused a major, permanent reshuffle in the TV5's programming. Yo Gabba Gabba! was the only Nick program retained by TV5; although produced by Nickelodeon, it wasn't dubbed to Filipino as the contract have been already expired. SpongeBob SquarePants was also aired on Q (GMA Network's former affiliate) every weekday mornings until February 18, 2011, when the channel was discontinued to relaunch as GMA News TV, a news-oriented channel.

In 2010, ABS-CBN brought the rights to air Nickelodeon shows. The network launched Nick Time (later renamed Nickelodeon on ABS-CBN) on July 26, 2010, airing every weekday mornings. Nickelodeon shows such as Dora the Explorer, SpongeBob SquarePants, The Adventures of Jimmy Neutron, and Avatar: The Last Airbender among others are shown during Nick Time, thus continuing the Filipino dub that was started by TV5. However, ABS-CBN's airing of Nickelodeon's shows was criticized for having majority of its episodes edited due to time constraints, heavy advertising gaps, and ABS-CBN's importance to movie and sports programming. Studio 23 (ABS-CBN's former affiliate) launched Nickelodeon on Studio 23 on October 4, 2010. Similar to its mother network ABS-CBN, the programs are dubbed in Tagalog. Studio 23 aired Catscratch which premiered in August 2011. Three years later, the Nickelodeon on Studio 23 block ended on January 16, 2014, to give way for the channel's relaunch as ABS-CBN Sports+Action (also known as S+A), a sports-oriented channel. To allow smooth transition of the new channel, Nickelodeon shows were put into ABS-CBN Sports+Action's Action Kids block on January 20, 2014, and all of its programs were reverted to its original English language rather than Filipino-dubbed. The block was cancelled early January 2015 when the launch of ABS-CBN's digital black box was later introduced.  Nickelodeon last aired on ABS-CBN on May 3, 2020, two days before the National Telecommunications Commission issued a cease-and-desist order due to the expiration of ABS-CBN's legislative license, thus temporarily stopping the free-to-air activities of ABS-CBN and S+A.

On Yey!, a digital channel of ABS-CBN TV Plus, aired Nickelodeon and Nick Jr. shows under the Nickelodeon sa Yey! block every morning from Mondays to Sundays until 2020. All programs were in Filipino-dubbed audio, with the exception of some shows like Peppa Pig. In 2017, Yey! launched The Loud House and Harvey Beaks for the first time. The next few years, they also aired The Fairly OddParents and The Mighty B!. The channel permanently ceased broadcasting on June 30, 2020, due to the alias cease-and-desist order (ACDO) issued by the National Telecommunications Commission (NTC) and Solicitor General Jose Calida against ABS-CBN TV Plus.

Programming

Nickelodeon airs new programs and episodes of current Nick shows every two to seven months after the US broadcast, but sometimes it takes a year. The program lineup is different from the Nick-Asia feed where live-action programs are aired twice in the afternoon and evening and the Nick Jr. block runs longer. Original Nickelodeon and Nick Jr. titles still remains in the channel.

Programming blocks
Current programming in Nickelodeon Philippines (also in Southeast Asia) has often been segmented into blocks.
 Nick Jr. on Nickelodeon (Every day, 8am – 11:30am) is a preschool block that airs children oriented programs. The programming block is now available as a channel in the Philippines on Sky Cable Channel 103 ,G Sat channel 22 and was recently added on Cignal's channel 77. The block airs Paw Patrol, Blaze and the Monster Machines,  and many more.

Former blocks
 TEENick was a programming block that airs current live-action programs. This doesn't exist anymore in the channel, this is due to the fact that the TeenNick shows are aired along with Nickelodeon.
 Weekend Express was a programming block that runs every weekends at noon. The block airs programs according to a weekly theme. The block ended on June 26, 2011, together with Nickelodeon (Southeast Asia).
 Lunch Toons was a limited time Nicktoon-based block which shows one random Nicktoon which is themed about a certain food.
 Hapon Hangout was a former block in the afternoon that debuted in February 2013 which aired mostly cartoons and live-action. It ended in December 2017.
 G Time (Mondays to Fridays/Weekends, 4pm – 6pm) was a programming block that airs animated and live-action series.
 Flick Picks (Fridays and Sundays, 6pm) was a programming block that airs movies.

Short segments
 Nick Tunes was a segment that aired songs from Nicktoon shows. Nick Tunes only appeared in commercial breaks. The segment underwent hiatus from late 2011 to April 2, 2012. The segment included songs from SpongeBob SquarePants, The Fairly OddParents, Back at the Barnyard and many others.
 Turn It Up is a music segment that shows songs, It mostly shows American songs and K-pop.
 Me TV was an interstitional show about children from all over the world. The show aired from 1998 to 2001

See also
 Nickelodeon
 Nickelodeon Asia
 Nickelodeon (Asian TV channel)

References

External links
Official website (in English)

Philippines
Television networks in the Philippines
English-language television stations in the Philippines
Children's television channels in the Philippines
Television channels and stations established in 1998
1998 establishments in the Philippines